The 2004 California Democratic presidential primary was held on March 2, 2004, the same day as the Republican primary. Senator John Kerry overwhelmingly won the primary over rivals Senator John Edwards, Congressman Dennis Kucinich, and Reverend Al Sharpton. The primary was open to both registered Democrats and unaffiliated voters. 440 delegates were at stake, with 370 tied to the March primary.

Candidates

Remaining
Senator John Kerry of Massachusetts
Senator John Edwards of North Carolina
Congressman Dennis Kucinich of Ohio
Reverend Al Sharpton of New York

Dropped out
Governor Howard Dean of Vermont dropped out on February 17, 2004.
NATO Commander Wesley Clark of Arkansas dropped out on February 11, 2004.
Senator Joe Lieberman of Connecticut dropped out on February 3, 2004.
Congressman Dick Gephardt of Missouri dropped out on January 20, 2004.
Senator Carol Moseley Braun of Illinois dropped out on January 15, 2004.

Campaign
With the Wisconsin primary results, which pitted John Kerry and John Edwards in a close fight, and Dean's withdrawal from the race, the campaign moved to Super Tuesday contests. California shared its primary with 9 other states, including New York and Ohio who also placed their primaries on March 2, 2004, or Super Tuesday.

For months Governor Dean had been leading in California, but since he's fall and Kerry's rise, polls in California were mixed. However, when Dean exited the race polls showed Kerry with over 2:1 leads over contender John Edwards.

John Kerry campaign

Following victories in Idaho, Utah and Hawaii, Kerry moved into the Super Tuesday contests swiftly and with major momentum. With polls showing him ahead in big Super Tuesday states such as California, New York, and Ohio, Kerry was positive on big wins in all three.

However, Kerry campaigned hard in the Golden State to and didn't take competition from Edwards and Kucinich lightly. The San Francisco Chronicle reported that Senator had spent 5 additional days in the state than any other candidate competing in the state as well as the fact that Kerry has increased State Staffers by 25 and increased Volunteer Numbers by hundreds in mid-February to ensure a sweep through the California Primary.

John Edwards campaign

John Edwards, having come out with a strong second place showing in Wisconsin (losing to Kerry 40%–34%), claimed significant momentum heading into California and other Super Tuesday nominating contests on the same day.

Edwards, not having as much popularity out west as in the Rust Belt, South, and Mid-West, did not focus on California until his unexpected final surge in Wisconsin, beating one-time California and national front-runner Howard Dean. Edwards sent Elizabeth Edwards out west to help campaign as well as opened Campaign offices across the state in a last-ditch effort for a final surge.

When the Democrats debated on February 26, 2004, in Los Angeles, Edwards hoped to score points by attacking John Kerry like in the New York debate. However, by the time of the debate, Kerry was already ahead of Edwards by 40 points.

Polling data
 
Source USA ELECTION POLLS

Exit polling

Source CNN EXIT POLLING

Results

Analysis
On Super Tuesday, Kerry swept all the primaries and eventually won the nomination the next day. He won California by a landslide. He won with nearly 65% of the vote, including every county in the state and every congressional district with over 60% except California's 2nd congressional district. Kerry's only legit opponent left, John Edwards, received under 20% of the vote, insuring his major defeat.

See also
 2004 California Republican presidential primary
 2004 Democratic Party presidential primaries
 2004 United States presidential election in California

References

Democratic primary, 2004
California
2004